Garbage Pail Kids is an American animated series which was produced in 1987, based on the Garbage Pail Kids trading cards, produced and directed by Bob Hathcock and co-written and developed by Flint Dille. Due to controversial themes, it did not air in the United States. However, it did air in certain countries around the world, including in Europe and the Caribbean.

Synopsis
The series stars the characters Split Kit, Elliot Mess, Terri Cloth, Patty Putty, and Clogged Duane as gross looking kids with abilities to help others. In the first two episodes, they have normal alter-egos, which transform into their "Garbage Pail" identities; later episodes show them exclusively in their Garbage Pail looks (it is never explained if their Garbage Pail personae became permanent).

The show also features parodies of popular movies of the era like the Indiana Jones series, Superman, Conan the Barbarian, King Kong, and The Fly. It also has segments between stories, such as "Garbage Pail Groaners" (jokes) and "Would We Lie To You?" (facts).

Cast

Main
 Tara Charendoff – Patty Putty (episodes 1–13), Still Jill (episode 3), Carly Cuts (episode 5)
 Cree Summer – Clogged Duane (episodes 1–13), Trashed Tracy (episode 1), Squishy (episode 2), Plain Jane (episode 3), Heartless Hal (episode 10),
 Noam Zylberman – Split Kit (episodes 1–13), Idaho Spud (episode 3), The Sturgeon General (episode 3)
 Michael Fantini – Elliot Mess (episodes 1–13), Clint Hardwood (episode 2), Colonel Corn (episode 3)
 Alyson Court – Terri Cloth (episodes 2–5, 7–13), Belle Button (episode 2), Lois Lamebrain (episode 7), Fay Hooray (episode 8)
 Len Carlson – Announcer (episodes 1–13), Dan Rattle (episodes 1 and 4)

Episodes

DVD release
Paramount Home Entertainment released Garbage Pail Kids: The Complete Series on DVD in Region 1 on April 4, 2006.

Controversy
The CBS television network directly produced the series, and ordered an entire season, heavily promoting it in the run-up to the 1987–88 season. However, it was abruptly pulled a few days before its debut, and (just like Little Muppet Monsters) was replaced with an extra half hour of Muppet Babies, which was expanded to 90 minutes in order to fill the time-slot after Garbage Pail Kids was pulled from the schedule.

CBS removed the series from their schedule, following protests from Action for Children's Television, the National Coalition on Television Violence, and the Christian Leaders for Responsible Television (a part of the American Family Association). The reasons given were that the series ridiculed the disabled and glorified violence, along with the claim that the program was effectively program-length ads for the toys and cards of the Garbage Pail Kids.

Some advertisers, such as Nabisco, McDonald's and Crayola also pulled out, either due to pressure from interest groups, or because they were unable to pre-screen the series from advanced tapes.

A few CBS affiliates, such as WIBW-TV in Topeka, Kansas; KOTV in Tulsa, Oklahoma and KREM-TV in Spokane, Washington made known they would not carry the series on their stations, notifying CBS of their pre-emptions weeks in advance of the debut.

Despite not airing in the United States, the series did air in numerous other countries, including Spain, Italy, France, Germany, and the United Kingdom, among others.

References

External links 
 
 Retro Junk – Garbage Pail Kids

1987 American television series debuts
1988 American television series endings
1980s American animated television series
American children's animated comedy television series
Animated television series about children
Animation controversies in television
English-language television shows
Television controversies in the United States
Television series by CBS Studios
Television series based on works
Works based on trading cards
Television series created by Flint Dille